Phong Niên a communes (xã) in Bảo Thắng District, Lào Cai Province, Northwest region of Vietnam. The commune has an area of 43.25 square kilometers and population of 6933 inhabitants (2006). The commune contains 19 villages (thôn and bản).

Populated places in Lào Cai province